W19 or W.19 may refer to :
 W19 (nuclear artillery shell)
 Hansa-Brandenburg W.19, a German fighter-reconnaissance aircraft